Unkanodes is a genus of true bugs belonging to the family Delphacidae.

The species of this genus are found in Eurasia.

Species:
 Unkanodes albifascia (Matsumura, 1900) 
 Unkanodes excisa (Melichar, 1898)

References

Delphacidae